Postal cards are postal stationery with an imprinted stamp or indicium signifying the prepayment of postage. They are sold by postal authorities.  On January 26, 1869, Dr. Emanuel Herrmann of Austria described the advantages of a Correspondenz Karte. By October 1, 1869 the world's first postal card was produced by Austria-Hungary.  They caught on quickly. By the end of 1870, Great Britain, Finland, Switzerland and Württemberg joined the countries issuing postal cards. In the United States, they were first produced in 1873.  Some of the forms taken by postal cards include the regular single card which may be commemorative or definitive, attached message-reply cards, airmail postal cards, and official postal cards used for official government business with a "penalty for private use".

To the post office, there were positive advantages to postal cards as opposed to correspondence in envelopes. The cards were lighter and less bulky than letters and they were all the same size. The result was that they occupied less than one third of the space required by the same number of letters.  To the public there were also advantages.  They were simple and cheap making them an instant success. Britain had a half-penny rate to begin with.  The U.S. "penny postcard" rate lasted through 1951.

Presumably for the purpose of getting a prompt reply, a sender was given the opportunity to pay for postage both ways with an attached message-reply card, first introduced by Germany in 1873.  Other European countries quickly followed suit.  Spain furnished message-reply cards to her Colonies: Cuba (1880), Philippines (1889) and Puerto Rico (1898).   The U.S. issued them first in 1892. Message-reply cards were attached tête-bêche
and likely to be perforated or rouletted to facilitate separation once in the hands of the recipient.  The recipient could then tear them apart and use the prepaid reply card to correspond with the original sender. Normally the message card would be identical to the reply card except with the distinction of having additional language such as "WITH REPLY CARD" or "La otra tarjeta es para la respuesta" or "Carte Postale Résponse" or similar words to distinguish the two.  In the U.S., message and reply cards have been identical since 1968.

The term postal card is clearly differentiated from the term postcard which is a term to designate cards prepared by private companies and which do not have prepaid franking.  They are readily available at commercial outlets.  The addition of an adhesive stamp is required to mail them. They are frequently illustrated with pictures or printed advertisements. They are not considered postal stationery any more than a plain envelope or sheet of parcel wrapping are.

References

Further reading 
 Bussey, Lewis E., Ed.; United States Postal Card Catalog, 2010, United Postal Stationery Society (UPSS).
 Dagnall, H. The Evolution of British Stamped Postcards & Letter Cards: their history & documentation. Queensbury: H. Dagnall, 1985 249p.
 Falberg, Bill, and Undersander, Dan; Historical Catalog of U.S. Postal Card Essays and Proofs: 1874–1885, UPSS, 2008.  (electronic version, 2010) 384 pages.
 Gage, Alexander D., Edward G. Fladung & Melvin Feiner (Eds.). Higgins & Gage World Postal Stationery Catalog. Pasadena: Higgins & Gage, 1964–89 (19 volumes)
 Gough, James P. The Postal History of the Universal Postal Union: The Postal Card (Worldwide) 1869–1974. London: Royal Philatelic Society London, 2019  935p. (2 volumes)
 Krieger, George T.; The Postal Stationery of the Possessions and Administrative Areas of the United States of America; United Postal Stationery Society, 2009, .
 Littrell, Robert, Ed.; Postal Cards of Spanish Colonial Cuba, Philippines and Puerto Rico, UPSS, 2010.
 Stendel, Robert; U.S. Domestic Postal Card Regulations, 1874–1885, United Postal Stationery Society, 2010 edition.
 Wukasch, Ken; Postal Cards of the World's Columbian Exposition; UPSS, 2005.

External links 

 Postal Cards and Post Cards History: Mostly picture postcards, but some information and illustrations of postal cards.
 Postal Cards of Cuba (1878 -1958): Comprehensive Cuban collection

Philatelic terminology
Postal stationery
Postcards